Mark Samuel Ebanks (born 26 December 1990) is a Caymanian footballer who plays as a forward for Academy SC and the Cayman Islands national team.

Club career
Ebanks was one of a group of Caymanian players identified by the country's football federation who they believed would benefit from playing overseas. He joined Ashford Town (Middlesex) in England after being invited over in late 2010 on an initial short term basis, although the move was extended then until the end of the season. He made one first-team appearance for the club, with his spell at the team affected by injuries.

International career
Ebanks represented the Cayman Islands during World Cup qualifying matches in 2011.

Career statistics

International

International goals
Scores and results list the Cayman Islands' goal tally first.

References

1990 births
Living people
Association football forwards
Caymanian footballers
Caymanian expatriate footballers
Expatriate footballers in England
Caymanian expatriate sportspeople in England
Expatriate soccer players in the United States
Caymanian expatriate sportspeople in the United States
Ashford Town (Middlesex) F.C. players
Fort Lauderdale Strikers players
Cayman Islands Premier League players
Southern Football League players
National Premier Soccer League players
Cayman Islands international footballers
Cayman Islands under-20 international footballers
Cayman Islands youth international footballers